Adele du Plooy (born 11 October 1980) is a South African sabre fencer. Du Plooy represented South Africa at the 2008 Summer Olympics in Beijing, where she competed in two sabre events.

For her first event, the women's individual sabre, du Plooy lost the first preliminary match to Ukraine's Halyna Pundyk, with a score of 7–15. Few days later, she joined with her fellow fencers and teammates Shelley Gosher, Elvira Wood and Jyoti Chetty, for the women's team sabre. Du Plooy and her team, however, lost the seventh place match to the Canadian team (led by Sandra Sassine), with a total score of 16 touches.

References

External links
 NBC Olympics Profile
 
 

South African female sabre fencers
Living people
Olympic fencers of South Africa
Fencers at the 2008 Summer Olympics
Sportspeople from Johannesburg
Afrikaner people
South African people of Dutch descent
South African people of German descent
1980 births